James Duncan (born November 12, 1968) is a Canadian musician, producer and trumpet player originally from Toronto, Ontario, now living in Brooklyn, NY.

As a producer, he has recorded under his own name, releasing solo 12" singles on labels such as Dancetracks (NY), London's Real Soon Records and West Norwood Cassette Library (WNCL) and his own imprint, Le Systeme Records, which he founded in 1999.

He has recorded and performed as a trumpet player with respected dance music artists Metro Area, Kelley Polar and Morgan Geist, all on Environ Records. He also appeared on The Rapture's "House of Jealous Lovers" 12" single (Morgan Geist Remix) on DFA Records. Resident Advisor named Metro Area's debut CD, which he played trumpet on, the 2nd Best Album of the 2000s and The Rapture's "House of Jealous Lovers" was rated 16th and 6th respectively on Pitchfork Media and NMEs Top Tracks of the 2000s lists. Recently, it was cited by Rolling Stone in their "100 Greatest Songs of the Century - So Far" listing at #73.

An active musician, he has also toured and/or recorded with The Silent League (Mercury Rev//The Arcade Fire/Beirut), Aarktica, Arthur's Landing (a group of collaborators of the late Arthur Russell), Glenn Branca, Rhys Chatham and Fist of Facts (ex-Liquid Liquid) among others. Appearances at concert venues include The Lincoln Center, MOMA's PS1, The Winter Music Conference in Miami, John Zorn's The Stone (New York), Joe's Pub, PS 122 (New York) and The Knitting Factory.

References

External links
 Izititiz "With Our With Jazz at Sound@One
 Izititiz at Forced Exposure
 James Duncan on Discogs
 Arthur's Landing CD release at NuBlu - 2011 in NYC

1968 births
Avant-garde jazz musicians
Canadian guitarists
Canadian record producers
Canadian trumpeters
Male trumpeters
Living people
Musicians from Toronto
21st-century trumpeters
Canadian male guitarists
21st-century Canadian male musicians
Canadian male jazz musicians